The Architectural Institute of British Columbia (AIBC) is the regulatory body responsible for registering and licensing all architects in the Province of British Columbia in Canada.

External links 
Webpage

Architecture associations based in Canada
Professional associations based in British Columbia